Tosco may refer to:

Tosco, synonym of Toscano, meaning "from Tuscany".
 Tosco (grape), another name for the Italian wine grape Uva Tosca
 Appennino Tosco-Emiliano National Park, a state-held natural preserve in northern-central Italy.
 Agustín Tosco, an Argentine union leader, 
 Tosco Corporation (The Oil Shale COrporation), a U.S. oil corporation, now part of ConocoPhillips.
 Toscotec, an Italian company
 TOSCO II process, a shale oil extraction technology
 MV Tosco, an Italian coastal tanker

See also
Toschi (disambiguation)
Etruscan (disambiguation)
Tuscan (disambiguation)
Tuscany (disambiguation)